Kerstin Yasmijn Casparij (born 19 August 2000) is a Dutch professional footballer who plays as a defender or midfielder for Women's Super League club Manchester City and the Netherlands national team.

Club career
Casparij made her debut for Heerenveen in the Eredivisie at the age of 15. After two years, she moved to VV Alkmaar for a season before returning to Heerenveen for another two seasons. She joined Twente in 2020.

On 26 July 2022, Casparij joined Women's Super League club Manchester City on a three-year deal.

International career
Casparij has played for Netherlands youth teams in several age groups. She made her senior team debut on 22 October 2021 as an 83rd-minute substitute for Daniëlle van de Donk in a 8–0 win against Cyprus.

Career statistics

Club

International

Honours
Twente
 Eredivisie: 2020–21, 2021–22
 Eredivisie Cup: 2021–22

References

External links
 
Senior national team profile at Onsoranje.nl (in Dutch)
Under-23 national team profile at Onsoranje.nl (in Dutch)
Under-19 national team profile at Onsoranje.nl (in Dutch)
Under-17 national team profile at Onsoranje.nl (in Dutch)
Under-16 national team profile at Onsoranje.nl (in Dutch)
Under-15 national team profile at Onsoranje.nl (in Dutch)

2000 births
Living people
Dutch women's footballers
Netherlands women's international footballers
Eredivisie (women) players
SC Heerenveen (women) players
FC Twente (women) players
Manchester City W.F.C. players
UEFA Women's Euro 2022 players
Dutch expatriate women's footballers
Dutch expatriate sportspeople in England
Expatriate women's footballers in England
Sportspeople from Alphen aan den Rijn
Footballers from South Holland
Women's association football defenders
Women's association football midfielders